Klaus Reschke (born 7 December 1953) is a retired East German Olympic skeet shooter who won one gold and two silver medals at the world championships in 1971–75. He placed sixth and fourth at the 1972 and 1976 Summer Olympics, respectively.

References

1953 births
Living people
German male sport shooters
Olympic shooters of East Germany
Shooters at the 1972 Summer Olympics
Shooters at the 1976 Summer Olympics
Sportspeople from Upper Bavaria
People from Garmisch-Partenkirchen (district)
People from Bezirk Leipzig